RC Roland is a Ukrainian rugby club in Ivano-Frankivsk. The club is named after the Roland Battalion, a Ukrainian subunit of the German Abwehr during World War II. They are one of the four teams comprising the additional group in the Ukraine Rugby Superliga.

Ukrainian rugby union teams
Sport in Ivano-Frankivsk